Garci Rodríguez de Montalvo (c. 1450 – 1505) was a Castilian author who arranged the modern version of the chivalric romance Amadis of Gaul, originally written in three books in the 14th century by an unknown author. Montalvo incorporated a fourth book in the original series, and followed it with a sequel, Las sergas de Esplandián. It is the sequel that Montalvo is most often noted for, not for the book itself, but because within the book he coined the word California.

Montalvo is known to have been referred to by several other names, including; Garci Ordóñez de Montalvo, García Gutiérrez de Montalvo and García de Montalvo el Viejo.

Biography
Montalvo was born in Medina del Campo in the Province of Valladolid, Spain. He came from an influential family, belonging to the Pollino lineage, one of the seven who dominated Medina's council policy. This lineage came from Martín Gutiérrez de Montalvo, VIII lord of Botalorno. At one time Montalvo had the title Alderman of Medina del Campo and was clerk of the land of the surrounding town. In 1482 he was part of a contingent sent from Medina del Campo to guard Alhama in the Province of Granada, which had recently been captured from the Moors.

Garci Rodríguez de Montalvo had three children: Pedro Vaca, Juan Vaca Montalvo and Francisco Vaca. His grandson García de Montalvo participated in the conquest of Venezuela and Peru around 1540 and was an informant for Fernández de Oviedo.

Records of a lawsuit held in the Chancery of Valladolid show that by 1505 Montalvo had died.  Most of his works may have been published after his death.

Las Sergas de Esplandián
Montalvo spent many years translating and recasting the Amadis of Gaul novels and appending a fourth book of his own. He then wrote a sequel, Las sergas de Esplandián (The Adventures of Esplandián), in which he tells the life and wandering of Amadis' eldest son. In the sequel Montalvo described a mythical Island of California as being west of the Indies:

The novel was highly influential in motivating Hernán Cortés and other explorers in the discovery of the "island", which they believed lay along the west coast of North America. In 1539, Francisco de Ulloa, sailing under the commission of Cortés, explored the Gulf of California and the coast of Baja California peninsula, determining that it was a peninsula, not an island. Nevertheless, the cartographic misconception of California as an island persisted on many European maps well into the 18th century.

The saga was continued by books by later authors. The books were the sixth novel, Florisando (by Ruiz Paez de Ribera, 1510), followed by Lisuarte of Greece (by Feliciano de Silva, 1514), Lisuarte of Greece (by Juan Diaz, 1525), Amadis of Greece (by Feliciano de Silva, 1530), etc.

See also
 Calafia
 History of California
 Origin of the name California

References

External links
 

Las Sergas de Esplandián (1526) (Spanish)  Original from Library of Catalonia, digitized 2009.

Quinto libro de Amadís (1526) (Spanish) Original from Library of Catalonia, digitized 2009.
Amadis of Gaul Vol.3 (1803) Longman and Rees, London

1504 deaths
Latin American folklore
Mexican folklore
Spanish folklore
1450 births
16th-century Spanish writers
16th-century male writers
16th-century Spanish novelists
Spanish male novelists
Etymology of California